The judo event at the European Youth Olympic Festival is a biannual judo competition organized by the European Judo Union for European judoka aged 18 and younger.

The most recent contest takes place in Banská Bystrica, Slovakia. The next will take place in Maribor, Slovenia.

Competitions

See also
 European Junior Judo Championships
 European Cadet Judo Championships

References

 
Sports at the European Youth Summer Olympic Festival
U18, EYOF
EYOF
European Youth Summer Olympic Festival